Henri is an Estonian, Finnish, French, German and Luxembourgish form of the masculine given name Henry.

People with this given name
 French noblemen
 See the 'List of rulers named Henry' for Kings of France named Henri.
 Henri I de Montmorency (1534–1614), Marshal and Constable of France
 Henri I, Duke of Nemours (1572–1632), the son of Jacques of Savoy and Anna d'Este
 Henri II, Duke of Nemours (1625–1659), the seventh Duc de Nemours
 Henri, Count of Harcourt (1601–1666), French nobleman
 Henri, Dauphin of Viennois (1296–1349), bishop of Metz
 Henri de Gondi (disambiguation)
 Henri de La Tour d'Auvergne, Duke of Bouillon (1555–1623), member of the powerful House of La Tour d'Auvergne
 Henri Emmanuel Boileau, baron de Castelnau (1857–1923), French mountain climber
 Henri, Grand Duke of Luxembourg (born 1955), the head of state of Luxembourg
 Henri de Massue, Earl of Galway, French Huguenot soldier and diplomat, one of the principal commanders of Battle of Almansa
 François-Henri de Montmorency, duc de Luxembourg, French general, marshal of France, one of the principal commanders of Battle of Steenkerque
 Henri, Prince of Condé (1552–1588), French Prince du Sang and Huguenot general
 Henri, Prince of Condé (1588–1646), member of the reigning House of Bourbon
 Henri de La Tour d'Auvergne, Viscount of Turenne, French Marshal General and one of the principal commanders of Thirty Years' War
 Prince Henri, Count of Paris (1908–1999), claimant to the throne of France from 1940 until his death
 Prince Henri, Count of Paris, Duke of France (born 1933), claimant to the French throne
 Prince Henri Marie Jean André de Laborde de Monpezat (1934-2018), Prince Consort to Queen Margrethe II of Denmark

 Others
 Henri Aalto (born 1989), Finnish footballer
 Henri Anspach (1882–1979), Belgian Olympic champion épée and foil fencer 
 Henri Anier (born 1990), Estonian footballer 
 Henri Becquerel (1852–1908), French physicist who discovered radioactivity
 Henri Bergson (1859–1941), French philosopher
 Henri Mathias Berthelot (1861-1931), French general during World War I
 Henri Bertini, French classical composer and pianist
 Henri Betti (1917–2005), French composer and pianist
 Henri Beunke (1851–1925), Dutch writer
 Henri Bienvenu (born 1988), Cameroonian footballer
 Henri Bol (1945–2000), Dutch still life painter
 Henri Cappetta, French ichthyologist
 Henri Cartan (1904–2008), French mathematician
 Henri Cartier-Bresson (1908–2004), French photographer considered to be the father of modern photojournalism
 Henri Casadesus (1879–1947), French violist and music publisher
 Henri Cassini (1781–1832), French botanist and naturalist
 Henri Coandă (1886–1972), Romanian inventor, aerodynamics pioneer and builder of an experimental aircraft
 Henri Cohen (water polo) (died 1930), Belgian water polo Olympic silver medalist
 Henri Cordier (1849–1925), French linguist and historian
 Henri Cordier (1856–1877), French mountain climber
 Henri Drell (born 2000), Estonian basketball player 
 Henri Dufaux (1879–1980), Swiss painter
 Henri Duvanel, French Olympic water polo player
 Henri Estienne (16th century), Parisian printer and classical scholar
 Henri Farman (1874–1958), French aviator and aircraft designer and manufacturer
 Henri-Nicolas Frey, French general, one of the principal commanders of Boxer Rebellion, Gaselee Expedition and Battle of Beijing
 Henri Giraud (1879-1949), French general, best known for being a commander of the Free French Forces in the Second World War.
 Henri Gouraud (1867-1946), French general, best known for his leadership of the French Fourth Army at the end of the First World War.
 Henri Häkkinen (born 1980), Finnish sport shooter
 Henri Järvelaid (born 1998), Estonian footballer
 Henri Kichka (1926–2020), Belgian writer and Holocaust survivor
 Henri Kontinen (born 1990), Finnish tennis player
 Henri Krasucki (1924–2003), French trade unionist
 Henri Lansbury (born 1990), English footballer
 Henri Lebesgue (1875–1941), French mathematician
 Henri Leconte (born 1963), French professional tennis player
 Henri Legay (1920–1992), French operatic tenor
 Henri Lehmann (1814–1882), German-born French historical painter and portraitist
 Henri Matisse (1869–1954), French artist
 Henri Menier (1853–1913), French businessman and adventurer
 Henri Messerer (1838-1923), French organist and music composer
 Henri Moissan (1852–1907), the French winner of the Nobel Prize in Chemistry in 1906. He worked with fluorine, and it killed him.
 Henri Nouwen (1932–1996), Dutch Catholic priest, professor and writer
 Henri van Opstal (born 1989), Dutch kickboxer
 Henri Pélissier (1889–1935), French racing cyclist
 Henri Pescarolo (born 1942), French racing driver
 Henri Poincaré (1854–1912), French mathematician, theoretical physicist and philosopher of science
 Henri Rang (1902–1946), Romanian horse rider
 Henri Richard (born 1936), Canadian professional ice hockey player 
 Henri Saint Cyr (1902–1979), Swedish military officer and equestrian
 Henri Tasso (1882–1944), French politician
 Henri de Toulouse-Lautrec (1864–1901), French painter, printmaker, illustrator
 Henri Toivonen (1956–1986), Finnish rally driver
 Henri Toivomäki (born 1991), Finnish footballer
 Henri Treial (born 1992), Estonian volleyball player
 Henri Weber (1944–2020), French politician
 Henri, cat in the web series Henri, le Chat Noir

Fictional characters
 Henri, French pigeon in the 1986 film An American Tail
 Henri, le Chat Noir, existential cat
 Henri, title character of Henri (2013 film)
 Pepe Henri Le Pew
 Henri Richard Maurice Dutoit LeFevbre, An energetic, rambunctious French boy in the 2002 animated series Liberty's Kids

Notable people with this surname
 Louie Henri (1864–1947), British singer and actress
 Robert Henri (1865–1929), an American painter
 Victor Henri (1872–1940), a French chemist

See also
 Henry (given name), an equivalent English given name
 Hurricane Henri (disambiguation)

French masculine given names
Estonian masculine given names
Finnish masculine given names